Nilgün Çelebi (born 1950) is a Turkish academic.

She studied sociology at the Hacettepe University in Ankara and worked as Professor of General Sociology and Methodology at the Department of Sociology, at the University of Ankara and the University of Mugla. She is interested in the linkage between ontological and epistemological-methodological approaches in sociology, the logic of science, conceptualizations, the concept of socius, the role of adjectives and cultural peculiarities, women’s entrepreneurship. She has published several books and articles mostly in Turkish.

References and selected books

 Sosyoloji Notlari, Published by Ani, Ankara , 2007,  
 Sosyoloji ve Metodoloji Yazilari, published by Ani, Ankara, 2004, 
 Turizm Sektöründeki Küçük İşyeri Örgütlerinde Kadin Girişimciler, published by TC.Başbakanlık Kadinin Statüsü ve Sorunlari Genel Müdürlügü, Ankara, 1997, 
 Bagımsız İşyeri Sahibi Kadinların Aile ve Iş Ilişkileri, Published by TC Başbakanlik Kadin ve Sosyal Hizmetler Müsteşarligi, Ankara, 1993, 
 http://www.goodreads.com/author/show/6903074.Nilg_n_elebi
 http://www.ankara.edu.tr/english/bolum.php?bodb=14&alt=2&bodb1=23

Hacettepe University
Turkish sociologists
Turkish women sociologists
1950 births
Living people